The ski jumping at the FIS Nordic World Ski Championships 2007 was part of the FIS Nordic World Ski Championships 2007 that took place in Sapporo, Japan, on February 24, February 25, and March 3, 2007.

Individual normal (HS100) hill
On March 3, 2007, at the Miyanomori (HS100) jumping hill, Slovenia's Rok Benkovič was the defending champion and finished 27th in this event at these games. Adam Małysz (Poland) won his fourth gold medal handily by having the longest jumps in both rounds of competition, the largest margin of victory in the event's history at the World Championships. The two World Cup leaders, Anders Jacobsen (Norway) and Gregor Schlierenzauer (Austria), finished seventh and eighth respectively.

Individual large (HS134) hill
February 24, 2007 at the Okurayama (HS134) jumping hill. Janne Ahonen of Finland was the defending champion and finished sixth at these championships. The current top three leaders in the 2006-7 ski jumping World Cup, Anders Jacobsen (Norway), Gregor Schlierenzauer (Austria), and Adam Małysz (Poland), all performed to less than expectations, finishing 14th, tenth, and fourth respectively. Olli had the longest jump of the competition with his second-round jump of 136.5 m, but lost to Ammann on style points.

Team large (HS134) hill
February 25, 2007 at the Okurayama (HS134) jumping hill. The Austrian team of Wolfgang Loitzl, Andreas Widhölzl, Thomas Morgenstern, and Martin Höllwarth were the defending champions and successfully defended their title despite Schlierenzauer having the weakest jumps of the entire team. The Japanese team delighted the home crowd by winning their first major medal since their silver medal victory at the 2003 FIS Nordic World Ski Championships in Val di Fiemme which was also in team large hill. FIS Vice-President Yoshiro Ito, who is also Sapporo 2007 organizing committee vice president and president of the Japanese Ski Association, expressed his delight in the Japanense ski jumping team's bronze medal win in the team large hill competition. Ito also expressed his satisfaction that both the Sapporo residents and the competitors are pleased at the organization of the event has run smoothly so far. Switzerland's Simon Ammann had the longest jumps of both rounds of competition with distances of 136.0 m and 135.5 m, respectively, though his Swiss teammates did not perform as well, causing them to finish seventh in the event.

References

External links
2007 FIS Nordic World Ski Championships official website 
2007 FIS Ski jumping results

2007 in ski jumping
FIS Nordic World Ski Championships 2007
sl:Svetovno prvenstvo v nordijskem smučanju 2007#Smučarski skoki